Kroll is a Polish thriller directed by a debuting Władysław Pasikowski. The film was released on 11 October 1991.

Plot
Poland of the late 1980s. A drafted soldier named Marcin Kroll goes AWOL after his brother-in-arms kills himself due to harassment from the longer-in-service soldiers. One of the unit's superiors, Lieutenant Arek, is ordered to bring Marcin back to the unit before the prosecutors take over the case. The Lieutenant meets Marcin's younger sister Marta, his wife Agata and his best friend Kuba Berger, who is about to go abroad. Together with not-intelligent soldier Wiaderny they decide to join the search. Finally, Arek manages to capture Kroll and finds that he joined the army voluntarily due to finding his wife cheating on him with Berger. To redeem himself, Berger plans to get Marcin back from the army.

Cast

External links

 

1991 films
1980s Polish-language films
Polish crime thriller films
1980s crime thriller films
Films directed by Wladyslaw Pasikowski